For the tool company, see Greenlee. For the county in the USA, see Greenlee County, Arizona.

Greenlee is a surname. Notable people with the surname include:

Bill Greenlee (1938–2010), American lobbyist
Bob Greenlee (born 1941), American businessman, politician, and philanthropist
Charles Greenlee (musician) (1927–1993), American jazz trombonist
David Greenlee (born 1960), American actor and voice actor
David N. Greenlee (born 1943), American diplomat
Fritz Greenlee (born 1943), American football player
Gus Greenlee (1893–1952), African-American businessman and Negro League baseball owner
Jim M. Greenlee (born 1952), American judge and politician
Kathy Greenlee, American politician
Karen Greenlee (born 1956), American necrophiliac
Sam Greenlee (1930–2014), American author and poet
Tom Greenlee, American football player
William K. Greenlee, American politician

See also
Greenlees